Tomohyphantes is a genus of Indonesian sheet weavers that was first described by Alfred Frank Millidge in 1995.

Species
 it contains only two species.
Tomohyphantes niger Millidge, 1995 – Indonesia (Krakatau)
Tomohyphantes opacus Millidge, 1995 – Indonesia (Krakatau)

See also
 List of Linyphiidae species (Q–Z)

References

Araneomorphae genera
Linyphiidae
Spiders of Indonesia